Sione Sialaoa (born 8 September 1956) is a Samoan weightlifter. He competed in the men's heavyweight I event at the 1984 Summer Olympics.

References

External links
 

1956 births
Living people
Samoan male weightlifters
Olympic weightlifters of Samoa
Weightlifters at the 1984 Summer Olympics
Place of birth missing (living people)